"Małe rzeczy" (eng. Little Things) is the first single from Sylwia Grzeszczak debut album Sen o przyszłości, released on 17 June 2011. 31 May 2011 the song debuted at RMF FM on 19th place and remained on the list for 13 weeks. The single quickly became a hit, and for eight weeks in a row was the most frequently played song in Polish radio stations, while the lyrics got first place in quotation Polish Video Chart. The song also gave Sylwia a success in the competition "Koncert Lata Radia Zet i TVP2".

Music video
Music video filmed in June 2011. It shows the palace in Moszna, while the scenes were filmed inside Cistercian monastery in Lubiaz. The video was created by Group 13 and was viewed more than 10 million times.

Live performance
17 July 2011, Sylwia sang the song at the concert "Hity Na Czasie" in Inowrocław.

Track listing

Charts

Weekly charts

Year-end charts

See also 
 List of number-one singles of 2011 (Poland)

References

2011 singles
Number-one singles in Poland